Nivaleta Iloai is a politician from Wallis and Futuna. She served as the president of the Territorial Assembly of Wallis and Futuna from April 1 to December 11, 2013; she was the first woman to hold that position. She is a member of the Union socialiste pour Wallis-et-Futuna, and represented the constituency of Hihifo. She was replaced as president by Petelo Hanisi.
She was again elected president of the Territorial Assembly on November 26, 2020.

She did not contest the 2022 Wallis and Futuna Territorial Assembly election.

References

Year of birth missing (living people)
Living people
Presidents of the Territorial Assembly of Wallis and Futuna
Wallis and Futuna women in politics
Women legislative speakers
21st-century French women politicians